The Indiana Department of Correction (IDOC) operates state prisons in Indiana. It has its headquarters in Indianapolis. 
As of 2019, the Indiana Department of Correction housed 27,140 adult Inmates, 388 juvenile Inmates, employed 5,937 State Employed Staff, and 1,718 Contracted Staff.

Facilities

Adult facilities
Current facilities:
 Branchville Correctional Facility (Low Medium security) - Branchville
 Chain O'Lakes Correctional Facility (Minimum security) - Albion
 Correctional Industrial Facility (Low Medium security) - Pendleton
 Edinburgh Correctional Facility (Minimum security) - Edinburgh
 Heritage Trail Correctional Facility (Minimum security) - Plainfield
 Indiana State Prison (Maximum security) - Michigan City
 Indiana Women's Prison (Maximum security) - Indianapolis
 Indianapolis Re-entry Educational Facility (Minimum security) - Indianapolis
 Madison Correctional Facility (Women's Minimum security) - Madison
 Miami Correctional Facility (Maximum security) - Bunker Hill
 New Castle Correctional Facility (Low Medium and Maximum security) - New Castle
 Pendleton Correctional Facility (Maximum security) - Pendleton
 Plainfield Correctional Facility (Low Medium security) - Plainfield
 Putnamville Correctional Facility (Low Medium security) - Greencastle
 Reception Diagnostic Center (administrative) - Plainfield
 Rockville Correctional Facility (Women's Intake - Low Medium security) - Rockville
 South Bend Community Re-entry Center (Minimum security) - South Bend
 Wabash Valley Correctional Facility (High Medium security) - Carlisle
 Westville Correctional Facility (Low Medium security) - Westville

Juvenile facilities
Current facilities:
 LaPorte Juvenile Correctional Facility. (Female/Maximum Security) - LaPorte
 Logansport Juvenile Correctional Facility (Intake/High Medium security) - Logansport
 Pendleton Juvenile Correctional Facility (Maximum security) - Pendleton

Former facilities 
 Bloomington Juvenile Correctional Facility
 Ft. Wayne Juvenile Correctional Facility
 Indianapolis Juvenile Correctional Facility
 In 2009, residents were moved to the Madison Juvenile Correctional Facility and inmates from the Indiana Women's Prison moved into the facility after the juvenile population relocated 
 North Central Juvenile Correctional Facility
 Northeast Juvenile Correctional Facility
 Plainfield Juvenile Correctional Facility
 South Bend Juvenile Correctional Facility
 Henryville Correctional Facility (Minimum security) - Henryville
Medaryville Correctional Facility (MYC) Level 1 Minimum security
 Madison Juvenile Correctional Facility (Intake/Maximum security) - Madison
 Located on the grounds of the Madison State Hospital campus, with the Madison Correctional Facility (Women). It was once the only state female juvenile facility in Indiana, but was replaced with LaPorte.

Fallen officers

Since the establishment of the Indiana Department of Correction, ten officers have died in the line of duty.

See also

 List of law enforcement agencies in Indiana

National:
 List of United States state correction agencies
 List of U.S. state prisons

References

External links
Indiana Department of Correction

State law enforcement agencies of Indiana
Penal system in Indiana
State corrections departments of the United States
Indiana
 
Juvenile detention centers in the United States